V773 Tauri is a young, multiple star system in the central region of Taurus, an equatorial constellation. This is a T Tauri-type variable star that ranges in apparent visual magnitude from 10.59 down to 10.95, which is too faint to be viewed with the naked eye. Based on various estimates, the system is located at a distance of approximately 433 light years from the Sun. It lies near the dark cloud Lynds 1495.

Hierarchy of orbits

This system was identified as a T Tauri star by A. E. Rydgren and associates in 1974. Radio emission was detected from this source in 1983. In 1993, it was discovered to be a double star with an angular separation of about : the two components are designated A and B. Component A was found to be a double-lined spectroscopic binary with an orbital period of 51 days.

A single star with that much mass would have 17 times the luminosity of the Sun, which is inconsistent with the observed optical luminosity. Photometry of component B suggests it is experiencing extinction from dust along the line of sight. The component is variable in the K band, which is consistent with clumps or clouds of dust in orbit.

In 2010, an extended eclipse was observed in the V773 Tauri system. This was interpreted as a circumbinary disk of component B passing in front of component A. The eclipse obscured 70% of the emission from component A and lasted 150 days.

References

Further reading

T Tauri stars
Circumstellar disks
Multiple star systems

Taurus (constellation)
022468
019762
Objects with variable star designations